The Matra Djet is a French sports car that was originally designed and sold by René Bonnet. As the Bonnet Djet it was the world's first rear mid-engined production road car. Different versions of the car were produced from 1962 until 1967 and sold under a variety of names that included René Bonnet Djet, Matra-Bonnet Djet, Matra Sports Djet and finally, Matra Sports Jet.

Djet 

The car started out as the René Bonnet Djet in June 1962. This model became known in retrospect as the Djet I. Bonnet named it "Djet" as he wanted it to be pronounced by French speakers more like the English word "jet" instead of the French word "jet". The name is often styled "D'jet" or "D'Jet". It was powered by a  1,108 cc engine from a Renault 8 in a mid-engine location mated to a gearbox from the Renault Estafette van. A fiberglass body was chosen for its lightness, ease of repairs, and to keep initial investment costs low. The body was made by Matra's Générale d'Applications Plastiques subsidiary in Romorantin, and was bonded directly to a steel chassis. The chassis were built in Bonnet's factory in Champigny-sur-Marne (a Paris suburb), where final assembly also took place.

As part of Bonnet's contract with Renault, the Djet was developed to be able to compete in several different classes, but in the end only 1,000 and 1,100 cc models were made. The competition Aérodjet of 1963 (pictured in the gallery) came with special long-tailed bodywork and bigger fenders to accommodate wider wheels. Multiple Aérodjets were entered by Automobiles René Bonnet at the 1964 24 Hours of Le Mans. 

The Djet's suspension was quite advanced for the time, being a fully independent system having upper and lower A-arms with coil springs and disc brakes at all four wheels. The car accommodated just two people, as the engine took the space where a rear seat would otherwise be. Announced in 1962, the Bonnet Djet was the world's first mid-engined production road car, beating the De Tomaso Vallelunga which was introduced in 1963, even though the first production Djets did not leave the factory until July 1963. During the two years before Matra took over, 198 Bonnet Djets were produced, with all but 19 being built to the lower-powered Djet I specification. After becoming the Matra Djet in 1964 a further 1,491 cars were produced before production ended in 1968. Fewer than 60 Vallelungas were built before De Tomaso replaced it with the Mangusta in 1967.

The Djet was priced at 20,000 French francs at launch, the same as its much larger and more luxurious contemporary, the Facel-Vega Facellia. The Bonnet did not impress with its level of finish, and the unisolated fibreglass bodywork made for an extremely noisy environment inside. Bonnet believed that the competition record of the Djet and his company would be enough to convince the public to purchase it, but this was not to be the case.

Matra takes control
When Bonnet got into financial troubles, Matra, who already supplied both the bodyshells and the factory for the Djet, took over René Bonnet Automobiles and its debts in October 1964. Production of the original Djet was stopped in December 1964. Matra's President Marcel Chassagny considered this a great opportunity for Matra to expand into the automobile market. Chassagny hired Jean-Luc Lagardère away from aeronautics competitors Avions Marcel Dassault to run the newly formed Matra Sports and Engins Matra divisions. Former Simca designer Philippe Guédon was hired to modify the original Bonnet Djet. Production resumed in April 1965 with two new versions; the Matra-Bonnet Djet V and the Djet V S, the latter having a Gordini-tuned engine.

During his 1965 tour of France, Yuri Gagarin was presented with a Matra-Bonnet Djet V S coupé by the French government. The car was later photographed wearing Soviet license plates. Production was gradually moved away from the old Bonnet plant, and late Jets were built entirely at Matra's home plant in Romorantin-Lanthenay.

After the Paris Motor Show in 1965, the Roman numerals and the Bonnet name were dropped. The car was now called the Matra Sports Djet 5. In 1966, a version with a bigger Gordini engine became available and the Djet name was dropped in favour of its original meaning: Jet. The model range now consisted of the Jet 5 (1,108 cc Renault 8 Major engine), Jet 5 S (1,108 cc Renault 8 Gordini engine) and Jet 6 (1,255 cc Renault Gordini engine).

Model range

René Bonnet Djet
There were four types of René Bonnet Djet:
René Bonnet Djet I 1,108 cc Renault 8 Major engine (72 PS), 
René Bonnet Djet II 1,108 cc Renault 8 Gordini engine (80 PS), 
René Bonnet Djet III / Djet IV 996 cc engine with double overhead camshafts (80 or 100 PS). These models were developed for competition use.

Only 198 René Bonnet Djets were built between 1962 and 1964, 179 of which were of the lesser Djet I model.

Matra-Bonnet Djet / Matra Sports Djet / Matra Sports Jet
Three types of Matra-Bonnet/Matra Sports Djet/Jet were produced from 1965 until 1967:
Matra-Bonnet Djet V / Matra Sports Djet 5 / Jet 5 1,108 cc Renault 8 Major engine, 
Matra-Bonnet Djet V S / Matra Sports Djet 5 S / Jet 5 S 1,108 cc Renault 8 Gordini engine, 
Matra Sports Jet 6 1,255 cc Renault 8 Gordini engine, .

Apart from these model designations, a luxury version with wooden dashboard and bigger bumper was available.

Production of the Jet ended in 1967 with a total of 1,495 Matra (D)Jets and it was replaced with the Matra 530. The last Jets (all Jet 6s) were sold in 1968.

Specifications

Gallery

References

External links 

 Matra D'Jet
 Matra Enthusiasts Club UK
 Simca en Matra Sports club (Dutch)
 Club René Bonnet Matra Sports (French)

Cars introduced in 1962
Djet
Djet
Group 4 (racing) cars
Rear mid-engine, rear-wheel-drive vehicles